Rangsang is an island of the Meranti Islands Regency of Riau Province in the Strait of Malacca, Sumatra, Indonesia. The island had a population of 51,452 at the 2010 Census.

The island measures . An Indonesian Navy warship is named after the island (KRI Pulau Rangsang)

Notes

Islands of Sumatra
Populated places in Indonesia